Andrew Gemmell (born 27 July 1945) is a Scottish former professional footballer who played as a winger.

Career
Born in Greenock, Gemmell played for Rankin Park United, Greenock Morton, Bradford City and Dunoon Athletic.

In October 2007, Gemmell joined the board of Scottish Football League club Dumbarton.

References

1945 births
Living people
Scottish footballers
Greenock Morton F.C. players
Bradford City A.F.C. players
English Football League players
Directors of football clubs in Scotland
Association football wingers